is a professional Japanese baseball player. He plays pitcher for the Chunichi Dragons.

Career
On 26 October 2020, Takahashi was the outright 1st draft pick for the Chunichi Dragons at the 2020 NPB Draft.

On 1 November, Takahashi signed a pre-contract with the Dragons guaranteeing a ¥100,000,000 sign-on bonus and a ¥16,000,000 yearly salary with ¥50,000,000 in incentives.

On July 7, 2022, Takahashi set a club record for fastest pitch thrown by a Japanese pitcher, clocking in at 98.2 miles per hour (158 kilometers per hour).

References

External links
Dragons.jp

2002 births
Living people
Baseball people from Aichi Prefecture
People from Owariasahi, Aichi
Japanese baseball players
Nippon Professional Baseball pitchers
Chunichi Dragons players
2023 World Baseball Classic players